Michel Daniel Picard (born November 7, 1969) is a Canadian former professional ice hockey player. Picard played in the National Hockey League with the Hartford Whalers, San Jose Sharks, Ottawa Senators, St. Louis Blues, Edmonton Oilers, and Philadelphia Flyers. , he serves as an amateur scout for the Blues.

Playing career
As a youth, Picard played in the 1981 and 1982 Quebec International Pee-Wee Hockey Tournaments with a minor ice hockey team from Beauport, Quebec City.

Picard began his career playing for Trois-Rivières Draveurs in the QMJHL, where he established himself as a scoring force who was also tough and hard hitting. His final year there he scored 140 points in 66 games.

Picard was drafted by the Whalers in the 9th round, 178th overall, in the 1989 NHL Entry Draft. He met with great success in the minor leagues, leading the American Hockey League with a franchise-record 56 goals for the Springfield Indians in 1991, while leading the team to its final Calder Cup championship.

However, Picard would never translate his earlier success to the NHL. He never played a full season in the NHL and only played in at least half of the games in a season once, during the 1999 season. That season he also played in five playoff games, the only time he played in the NHL playoffs.

For the 2002 season Picard played in the Deutsche Eishockey Liga in Germany for the Adler Mannheim. He then played for two years with the Grand Rapids Griffins (a team for which he played parts of six seasons in all, and is the career leader in goals, assists and points) in the AHL before joining Thetford Mines Prolab of the Ligue Nord-Américaine de Hockey in 2004. He led the team in scoring in 2005, 2006 and 2007 and was the leading scorer in the LNAH in the 2007 season, retiring after the end of the 2009 season.

As of November 2014, Picard is the 16th leading goal scorer in minor league history with 563 , as well as 19th in points with 1256.

Career statistics

Regular season and playoffs

References

External links
 

1969 births
Living people
Adler Mannheim players
Binghamton Whalers
Canadian ice hockey left wingers
Edmonton Oilers players
Frölunda HC players
Grand Rapids Griffins players
Grand Rapids Griffins (IHL) players
Hartford Whalers draft picks
Hartford Whalers players
Kansas City Blades players
Ottawa Senators players
Philadelphia Flyers players
Philadelphia Phantoms players
Portland Pirates players
Prince Edward Island Senators players
St. Louis Blues players
St. Louis Blues scouts
San Jose Sharks players
Springfield Indians players
Trois-Rivières Draveurs players
Ice hockey people from Quebec City
Canadian expatriate ice hockey players in Germany
Canadian expatriate ice hockey players in Sweden